Roy Davies may refer to:
Roy Davies (bishop), Bishop of Llandaff 1985–99
Roy Davies (cricketer), Welsh cricketer
Roy Davies (soccer) (1924–73), South African football player

See also
Roy Davis (disambiguation)